This is a list of Uzbekistan Oliy League PFL transfers in the year 2011 by club. Only transfers of the Uzbek League are provided.  Start of the season was April 2011.

Uzbek League

FK Andijan

Winter 2011

In:
 

Out:

Summer 2011

In:
 

Out:

FK Buxoro

Winter 2011

In:
 

  	 	 	 
Out:

Summer 2011
In:

 

  	 	 	 
Out:

FC Bunyodkor

Winter 2011

In:

Out:

Summer 2011

 
In:

Out:

FK Dinamo Samarqand

Winter 2011

In:

Out:

Summer 2011

 
In:

Out:

Qizilqum Zarafshon

Winter 2011

In:

Out:

Summer 2011

 
In:

Mash'al Mubarek

Winter 2011

In:

.

Out:

Summer 2011

In:

Out:

Metallurg Bekabad

Winter 2011

In:

Out:

Summer 2011

 
In:

Out:

Navbahor Namangan

Winter 2011

In:

Out:

Summer 2011

 
In:

Out:

Nasaf Qarshi

Winter 2011

In:

Out:

Summer 2011

Out on loan
The following players played the second half of the season out on loan.  

 (at  FC Shurtan Guzar)
 (at  FC Shurtan Guzar)

 (at  Mash'al Mubarek)

 (at  FC Shurtan Guzar)
 (at  FC Shurtan Guzar)

FK Neftchi Farg'ona

Winter 2011

In:
 

  	 	 	 
Out:

Summer 2011
In:

 

  	 	 	 
Out:

Olmaliq FK

Winter 2011

In:
 

  	 	 	 
Out:

Summer 2011
Transfers in summer break of season. 

In:

 

  	 	 	 
Out:

FC Pakhtakor Tashkent

Winter 2011

In:
As of 26 February 2011.

Out:
As of 5 February 2011, four player left the club 

Out on loan:

 (at  Anzhi Makhachkala)
 (at  Suwon Samsung Bluewings)

 (at  Lokomotiv Tashkent)
 (at  Lokomotiv Tashkent)

Summer 2011
Out on loan:

 (at  Dalian Shide F.C.)

Sogdiana Jizzakh

Winter 2011

In:

Out:

Summer 2011

In:

Out:

FC Shurtan Guzar

Winter 2011

In:
 

Out:

Summer 2011

In

Out

See also 
2011 Uzbek League
List of Uzbek football transfers 2010

References

External links 
2011 Uzbek League Transfers

Transfers
Uzbek
Uzbek
2011